Blyth's vole (Phaiomys leucurus) is a species of rodent in the family Cricetidae.  It is the only species in the genus Phaiomys.
It is found in mountainous regions in northern India, Nepal and China. It is a burrowing rodent and lives in small colonies. It has a wide distribution and faces no particular threats so the International Union for Conservation of Nature has assessed its conservation status as being of "least concern".

Description
The dorsal fur is light yellowish-brown, the underparts are yellowish-grey and there is a gradual transition where the two colours meet. The upper surface of both fore and hind feet is yellowish-white, and the tail is unicoloured, being yellowish-brown both above and below. The ears are small and rounded and the claws long, both being adaptations for living underground.

Distribution and habitat
It inhabits forests and Alpine grassland on rocky mountains, burrowing especially in the banks of rivers and lakes, and sometimes tunnelling under boulders and making use of crevices between rocks. It also moves along passageways that it makes under lying snow.

Behaviour
Blyth's vole is a diurnal vole that mostly lives underground, with up to twenty individuals living colonially in a deep burrow system. It feeds on vegetable matter and can have litters of as many as seven offspring.

Status
Blyth's vole has a wide range and is assumed to have a large total population but has not been recorded from any particular protected areas. The population trend is unknown, but no particular threats have been identified other than loss of habitat, and the International Union for Conservation of Nature has assessed the vole's conservation status as being of "least concern".

References

Musser, G. G. and M. D. Carleton. 2005. Superfamily Muroidea. pp. 894–1531 in Mammal Species of the World a Taxonomic and Geographic Reference. D. E. Wilson and D. M. Reeder eds. Johns Hopkins University Press, Baltimore.

Arvicolini
Mammals described in 1863
Rodents of China
Rodents of India
Mammals of Nepal
Fauna of Tibet
Taxa named by Edward Blyth
Taxonomy articles created by Polbot